Jess Willard Phillips Jr. (born February 28, 1947) is an American former professional football player who played running back for 10 seasons in American Pro Football. He began his pro career with the American Football League's Cincinnati Bengals in 1968, and also played for the NFL's Bengals as well as the  New Orleans Saints, Oakland Raiders and New England Patriots.

Early life
Phillips grew up in Beaumont, Texas, the oldest of four children. He attended Charlton-Pollard High School.

He played college football at Michigan State University, where he played safety on defense. He played in one of the greatest college football games of all-time, the historic 10-10 tie between undefeated MSU and undefeated Notre Dame. He was a mathematics major.

However, during his senior season he forged a check and was sentenced to 18 months for four years at the penitentiary at Jackson, Michigan. He was paroled after four months; he credits his time in prison with teaching a lot about life, but he gave up hope of being drafted into pro football.

But the expansion Cincinnati Bengals and coach Paul Brown were willing to take a chance on Phillips. He was drafted as a defensive back in the fourth round (84th overall) of the 1968 NFL/AFL Draft by the then-AFL Bengals. He was released from prison on August 2, 1968, and was met by Paul Brown's son, Mike Brown, who took Phillips directly to the Bengals training camp in Wilmington, Ohio, where he was installed as a defensive back. Paul Brown called Phillips "a kid with an engaging personality who has it all in front of him."

In his rookie season, 1968, the expansion Bengals' first season, he played strong safety on defense but also had one carry for seven yards on offense. But in 1969 he was switched to fullback and came on strong with 118 carries for 578 yards (a 4.9 average) and three touchdowns, including a career-long 83-yard run. He also caught 13 passes for 128 yards, a 9.8 average.

In his third season, 1970, he started all 14 games and increased his totals to 163 carried for 648 yards (a 4.0 average) and four touchdowns, plus 31 receptions for 124 yards and one touchdown. In 1971, he started 10 of 14 games, with 94 carries for 420 yards (a 4.5 average) and 22 receptions for 125 yards and one touchdown.

In 1972, his playing time decreased with the Bengals. He started in three of the 13 games he played, with 48 carries for 207 yards (a 4.3 average) and one touchdown, plus 10 receptions for 50 yards.

Phillips joined the New Orleans Saints for the 1973 season and thrived as a starter for all 14 games. He totaled 198 carries for 663 yards (both career highs) although his yards-per-carry average fell to 3.3. He also had 22 receptions for a career-high 169 yards.

In 1974, he was no longer a starter, but still played in all 14 games with 174 carries for 556 yards (a 3.2 average) and two touchdowns with 11 receptions for 55 yards.

By 1975 he joined the Oakland Raiders, for whom he played in all 14 games, starting two, and had 63 carries for 298 yards (a 4.7 average) and one touchdown with four receptions for 25 yards. He also returned 12 kicks for 310 yards, a 25.8 average.

In 1976, he was a member of the New England Patriots, for whom he played 13 games with 24 carries for 164 yards and one touchdown with one reception for 18 yards. He also returned 14 kicks for 397 yards, a career-high 28.4 average. His last season was 1977 with the Patriots. He played all 14 games but with only five carries for 27 yards and one touchdown.

Personal life
As a sophomore at Michigan State, Phillips met his future wife, Julie. On September 1, 1969, Julie gave birth to their son Jess Phillips III.

During his off-seasons in Cincinnati, Phillips worked as a mortgage loan officer for then Central Trust Bank, and he worked for a company that printed weekly commodity charts and mailed them out to futures' brokers and traders.

References

1947 births
Living people
People from Beaumont, Texas
American football running backs
Cincinnati Bengals players
New Orleans Saints players
Oakland Raiders players
New England Patriots players
Michigan State Spartans football players
American Football League players